Khorramdarreh is a city in Zanjan Province, Iran.

Khorramdarreh or Khorram Darreh may also refer to:
Khorramdarreh, Isfahan
Khorramdarreh, Kerman
Khorram Darreh, Razavi Khorasan
Khorram Darreh, Abhar, Zanjan Province
Khorramdarreh County, in Zanjan Province
Khorramdarreh Rural District, in Zanjan Province